Stefanie Jill Ridel (born May 17, 1973) is an American singer, songwriter, and actress. She was a member of the girl group Wild Orchid, and was a co-host of the television show Great Pretenders.

Early life
Stefanie Jill Ridel was born in Hollywood, California. She has two brothers, Mark and Chris Ridel.

Acting career
She is best known as a co-host of the TV show Great Pretenders. From 1983 to 2004 she made various appearances singing on television, mostly with Wild Orchid. Her acting career began on commercials and landing guest star roles on TV shows like The Facts Of Life, The Golden Girls, Punky Brewster, Married... with Children, and Blossom. She lent her singing voice to the character, Yasmin in the film Bratz.

Music career
In 1991, a girl group called NRG was formed. They were a quartet made up of herself, Heather Holyoak, and Stacy Ferguson, and Renee Sands of Kids Incorporated. They were signed to Sony Records that year, and changed their name to Wild Orchid. Soon Heather left the group for college and was replaced by Micki Duran, also a Kids Incorporated alumni. They recorded a debut album, but Micki soon left the group to pursue acting, and they were dropped from Sony. They signed to RCA Records, and recorded their self-titled debut album, which was released in 1996. Their second album, Oxygen, was released in 1998, and they recorded Fire in 2000.

It was leaked to the internet and they were dropped from RCA in 2001. Ferguson left the group, and they became a duo as they opened Yellow Brick Records. Hypnotic was released on the internet in 2003, and the band then broke up in 2004. She took a short break from music before she and Kyle Hendricks, under the stage name Rain, created the band, 5th Element. She also produced and wrote for The Slumber Party Girls. She produced tracks for Prima J. 5th Element has released a debut album, Here Comes the Rain Again, and Stefanie co-founded Talent Bootcamp, a camp training today's greatest music sensations.

She contributed to the Bratz movie soundtrack in 2007.

Modeling career
She was a spokesmodel for Bongo and Guess!.

Personal life
While a member of Wild Orchid, she had a brief marriage, before marrying longtime manager Ron Fair. They have three sons (Ellington Fair, born April 16, 2007, London Fair, born in 2009, and Rocco Fair, born in 2011) and one daughter (Ella Fair, born 2008).

Discography

with Wild Orchid

Albums
Wild Orchid (1996)
Oxygen (1998)
Hypnotic (2003)

Singles
"At Night I Pray" (1996)
"Talk to Me" (1997)
"Supernatural" (1997)
"Follow Me" (1997)
"Be Mine" (1998)
"Stuttering (Don't Say)" (2001)

With 5th Element

Singles
"2 Nite"
"Deeper"
"Judgment Day"
"Follow Me"
"Just Another Day"
"Just Groove"
"Underbelly"
"Happy"
"I Won't Walk Away"
"Here Comes the Rain Again Remixes"

Soundtrack contributions
Bratz: Motion Picture Soundtrack (2007)

As Songwriter
Bratz: The Movie (2007)
Hannah Montana: The Movie (2009)
"Don't Waste The Pretty" (2010) - Allison Iraheta

Television work
The Facts of Life (1 episode, 1983)
Punky Brewster (1 episode, 1985)
The Golden Girls (1 episode, 1989)
Oh Henry! ...Megan (1989)
Blossom (2 episode, 1991 & 1993)...Barbara Jenkins and Melissa Alter
Cutters ...Fawn (1993)
Joe's Life ...Karen (1993)
Married... with Children (1 episode, 1994) ...Lisa Pruner
Locals...Kris (1994)
Goode Behavior ...Stefanie (1996)
Great Pretenders ...Herself as Co-Host (unknown episodes, 1998)

References

External links

1973 births
Living people
20th-century American women singers
21st-century American women singers
American child actresses
American dance musicians
American women pop singers
American women singer-songwriters
American film actresses
American television actresses
Wild Orchid (group) members
20th-century American singers
21st-century American singers
American singer-songwriters